Alec Clarke (11 February 1904 – 1 March 1959) was a South African cricketer. He played in thirteen first-class matches for Border from 1924/25 to 1929/30.

See also
 List of Border representative cricketers

References

External links
 

1904 births
1959 deaths
South African cricketers
Border cricketers
Cricketers from Port Elizabeth